Duriocoris is a genus within the subfamily Stenopodainae of Reduviidae. 3 species are known from China.

Partial list of species

Duriocoris geniculatus 2005

References

Reduviidae
Hemiptera of Asia